"Baby by Me" is the lead single by American rapper 50 Cent from his fourth studio album Before I Self Destruct. It was commercially released on September 10, 2009. The song was produced by Polow Da Don and William Tyler, and written by Curtis Jackson, Jamal Jones, William Tyler and Shaffer Smith. The single version features vocals by R&B singer Ne-Yo.

Background
"Baby by Me" is a Hip Hop song by 50 Cent from his 4th officially released studio album Before I Self Destruct, and was released as the first official single from the album. A couple hours later, the song was then uploaded onto 50 Cent's MySpace page.

There are 2 versions of the song, the original version features singer Jovan Dais and the remix version features Ne-Yo. Both versions were released online simultaneously. The official single version is the remix version which features Ne-Yo, and is featured on the album.

"The album version of the song was the one where you don't even know the singer," 50 told DJ Whoo Kid over the weekend on Sirius XM Radio. "I did the reference in the studio. It's a little more visual. Ne-Yo lightened it up a little bit and made it ready for radio. It works. I gotta sift through and see what I'm gonna put on the album. The Ne-Yo record is a stronger radio version."

The single was made available to download on Amazon and iTunes on October 26, 2009.

Music video
The music video for "Baby by Me" was shot in October 2009 and features Kelly Rowland as 50 Cent's love interest. 50 ran into her when he was presenting at the Los Premios MTV Latinoamérica 2009 awards show in Los Angeles, California, and it occurred to him to snag the singer for his video, which was set to roll production 2 days later.

This video is great... Chris Robinson came up with a great treatment for it. It's obvious I wasn't in a hurry to make the music video until I found the right treatment, the right idea, to bring it to life.

50 Cent's said he was dead set on having a celebrity, rather than an unknown model, star as the girl he falls in love with in the video.

I had to find the right person to be my love interest in the music video...I found Kelly. It matches perfectly. The acting in the project is great. I think when people see it, they are gonna be surprised by it.

Ne-Yo, who sings on the hook, shot his part for the video in New York City, New York on Saturday, while 50 Cent and Rowland filmed in Los Angeles, California.
The video premiered on November 2 on all MTV Networks. It also ranked at #43 on BET's Notarized: Top 100 Videos of 2009 countdown.

The song and video was very successful and has been viewed over 110 million times on YouTube.

Reception
Billboard has stated: "With its club synthesizers and Ne-Yo-aided chorus, the track is far more radio-friendly than his past attempts. But it's also the least distinctive. A song like "Baby by Me" that overtly reaches for a pop audience may put 50 Cent back on the airwaves, but it won't necessarily energize the rapper's core fans. At this point, they might be more receptive to hearing something outside the box."

Diggy Simmons and Khalil have freestyled over the beat in a remix called "Be My Baby".

Track listing
Digital Single

US CD Single

UK CD Single

UK Digital Single

UK Remixes, Pt. 1 CD Single

UK Remixes, Pt. 2 CD Single

Chart performance
"Baby by Me" debuted on the Billboard Hot 100 at #31 on the week ending November 14, 2009. The following week, it remained at that position, but the week after that, it moved up three positions to #28. In its fourth week it fell one spot to number #29. However, it also continued to rise on the rap charts, reaching a new peak of #3, and on the R&B/Hip-hop charts, reaching a new peak of #9. On the UK Singles Chart, "Baby by Me" peaked at #17 on the week ending December 19, 2009, failing to enter the top ten just as previously intended lead single "Get Up" performed in 2008. (See 50 Cent discography).

Charts

Weekly charts

Monthly charts

Year-end charts

Certifications

References

2009 singles
50 Cent songs
Music videos directed by Chris Robinson (director)
Ne-Yo songs
Song recordings produced by Polow da Don
Songs written by Ne-Yo
Songs written by 50 Cent
2009 songs
Aftermath Entertainment singles
Shady Records singles
Interscope Records singles